Ismail Joubert (7 December 1920 – 23 December 2002), commonly known as Tatamkhulu Afrika, which is Xhosa for Grandfather Africa, was a South African poet and writer. His first novel, Broken Earth was published when he was seventeen (under his "Methodist name"), but it was over fifty years until his next publication, a collection of verse entitled Nine Lives.

He won numerous literary awards including the gold Molteno Award for lifetime services to South African literature, and in 1996 his works were translated into French. His autobiography, Mr Chameleon, was published posthumously in 2005.

Biography
Tatamkhulu Afrika was born Mogamed Fu'ad Nasif in Egypt to an Egyptian father and a Turkish mother, and came to South Africa as a very young child. Both his parents died of flu, and he was fostered by family friends under the name John Carlton.

He fought in World War II in the North African campaign and was captured at Tobruk. His experiences as a prisoner of war featured prominently in his writing. After World War II he left his foster family and went to Namibia (then South-West Africa), where he was fostered by an Afrikaans family, taking his third legal name of Jozua Joubert.

In 1964 he converted to Islam, legally changed his name to Ismail Joubert, and spent some time in prison. It was here that he first experienced forms of homosexual sex being employed in a state context to intimidate political prisoners, which would go on to become a major theme of his later literary work, as tensions between homophobia and homoeroticism feature largely.

He lived in Cape Town's District 6, a mixed race inner-city community. District 6 was declared a "whites only" area in the 1960s and the community was destroyed. With an Arab father and a Turkish mother, Afrika could have been classified as a "white", but refused as a matter of principle. He founded Al-Jihaad to oppose the destruction of District Six and apartheid in general, and when this became affiliated with the African National Congress' armed wing, Umkhonto We Sizwe, he was given the praise name of Tatamkhulu Afrika, which he adopted until he died.

In 1987 he was arrested for terrorism and banned from speaking or writing in public for five years, although he continued writing under the name of Tatamkhulu Afrika. He was imprisoned in the same prison as Nelson Mandela and was released in 1992.

Tatamkulu Afrika died on 23 December 2002 shortly after his 82nd birthday, from injuries received when he was run over by a car two weeks before, just after the publication of his final novel, Bitter Eden.  He left a number of unpublished works, including his autobiography, two novels, four short novels, two plays and poetry.

Poetry

 Night Light  (Carrefour/Hippogriff, 1991)
 Dark Rider (Snailpress/Mayibuye 1993)
 Maqabane (Mayibuye Books, 1994)
 Flesh and the Flame (Silk Road, 1995)
 The Lemon Tree (Snailpress, 1995)
 Turning Points (Mayibuye, 1996)
 The Angel and Other Poems (Carapace, 1999)
 Mad Old Man Under the Morning Star (Snailpress, 2000)
 Au Ceux (French translations) (Editions Creathis l'ecole des filles, 2000)
 Nothing's Changed (2002)

Novels
 Broken earth (1940)
 The Innocents (1994)
 Tightrope (1996)
 Bitter Eden (Arcadia Books, 2002) An autobiographical novel set in a prisoner-of-war camp during World War II. The novel deals with three men who see themselves as straight but must negotiate the emotions that are brought to the surface by the physical closeness of survival in the male-only camps. The complex rituals of camp life and the strange loyalties and deep bonds between the men are depicted.
 Mr Chameleon: An Autobiography, Jacana Media, 2005.

References

Nothing's Changed, Brief biography (Powerpoint format)
"Mother, Missus, Mate: Bisexuality in Tatamkhulu Afrika's Mr Chameleon and Bitter Eden," English in Africa 32,2:185-211. Cheryl Stobie, 1 October 2005, Rhodes University, Institute for the Study of English in Africa.

External links

1920 births
2002 deaths
South African male poets
South African military personnel of World War II
South African prisoners of war
Prisoners and detainees of South Africa
Egyptian emigrants to South Africa
South African people of Turkish descent
South African male novelists
South African LGBT novelists
LGBT Muslims
20th-century South African poets
20th-century South African novelists
20th-century South African male writers
South African Muslims
Converts to Islam
Recipients of the Molteno medal
Muslim South African anti-apartheid activists
Road incident deaths in South Africa
Pedestrian road incident deaths
20th-century South African LGBT people
UMkhonto we Sizwe personnel